Olga Raspopova (born 27 December 1978) is a Russian middle-distance runner. She competed in the women's 800 metres at the 2000 Summer Olympics.

References

1978 births
Living people
Place of birth missing (living people)
Russian female middle-distance runners
Olympic female middle-distance runners
Olympic athletes of Russia
Athletes (track and field) at the 2000 Summer Olympics
Russian Athletics Championships winners